Kier John R. "Bong" Quinto (born December 15, 1994) is a Filipino professional basketball player for the Meralco Bolts of the Philippine Basketball Association (PBA).

PBA career statistics

As of the end of 2021 season

Season-by-season averages

|-
| align=left | 
| align=left | Meralco
| 43 || 19.6 || .430 || .403 || .574 || 2.5 || 1.5 || .5 || .0 || 5.2
|-
| align=left | 
| align=left | Meralco
| 18 || 26.8 || .399 || .275 || .655 || 4.6 || 2.7 || .5 || .2 || 8.4
|-
| align=left | 
| align=left | Meralco
| 42 || 23.5 || .366 || .225 || .775 || 3.4 || 3.1 || .5 || .1 || 6.8
|-class=sortbottom
| align="center" colspan=2 | Career
| 103 || 22.4 || .393 || .297 || .687 || 3.2 || 2.3 || .5 || .1 || 6.4

References

1994 births
Living people
Basketball players from Quezon City
Filipino men's basketball players
Letran Knights basketball players
Meralco Bolts draft picks
Meralco Bolts players
Shooting guards
Small forwards